Paul John McKinnon (born 1 August 1958) is an English former professional footballer who played as a striker.

Career
Born in Frimley, Surrey, McKinnon started his career in non-league football with Woking before joining Sutton United in 1977. He later moved to Sweden where he represented Malmö FF in the Cup Winners' Cup and the UEFA Cup. McKinnon played briefly in the Football League for Blackburn Rovers, making five appearances during the 1986–87 season before returning to Sutton United. In 1991, he signed for Slough Town, scoring 36 goals in 98 appearances during his two seasons at the club. He then returned to Sutton for an eighth spell at the club. He is Sutton United's record goalscorer with 279 goals in 525 games.

References

1958 births
Living people
People from Frimley
English footballers
English expatriate footballers
Association football forwards
Blackburn Rovers F.C. players
Sutton United F.C. players
Malmö FF players
Trelleborgs FF players
Örebro SK players
English Football League players
Allsvenskan players
Expatriate footballers in Sweden